The 1943 Women's Western Open was a golf competition held at Glen Oak Country Club, the 14th edition of the event. Patty Berg won the championship in match play competition by defeating Dorothy Kirby in the final match, 1 up.

Women's Western Open
Golf in Illinois
Glen Ellyn, Illinois
Women's Western Open
Women's Western Open
Women's Western Open
Women's sports in Illinois